Michael Quinn (born 2 July 1962) is an Australian former cricketer. He played 31 first-class cricket matches for Victoria between 1984 and 1989.

See also
 List of Victoria first-class cricketers

References

External links
 

1962 births
Living people
Australian cricketers
Victoria cricketers
Cricketers from Adelaide